Simone Cercato (born 25 February 1975 in Dolo) is a freestyle swimmer from Italy, who won the bronze medal in the men's 4×200 m freestyle event at the 2004 Summer Olympics in Athens, alongside Emiliano Brembilla, Filippo Magnini, and Massimiliano Rosolino. He made his Olympic debut in 2000 (Sydney, Australia).

References

External links 
  
 
 

1975 births
Living people
Italian male swimmers
Swimmers at the 2000 Summer Olympics
Swimmers at the 2004 Summer Olympics
Olympic swimmers of Italy
Olympic bronze medalists for Italy
Olympic bronze medalists in swimming
Italian male freestyle swimmers
European Aquatics Championships medalists in swimming
Medalists at the 2004 Summer Olympics
Mediterranean Games gold medalists for Italy
Mediterranean Games medalists in swimming
Swimmers at the 2001 Mediterranean Games